Francisco Javier "Patxi" López Álvarez (born 4 October 1959) is a Spanish politician serving as Member of the Congress of Deputies and chair of the Constitutional Committee.

Previously, he has served as President of the Autonomous Community of the Basque Country from 2009 to 2012 and President of the Congress of Deputies, the lower house of the Spanish Cortes Generales, in the short lived 11th legislature from January 2016 to July 2016. He was also Secretary-General of the Socialist Party of Euskadi - Euskadiko Ezkerra (PSE-EE), the Basque affiliate of the Spanish Socialist Workers' Party (PSOE), from 2002 to 2014.

Political career
López, born into a socialist family, was influenced early in life by the political stance of his father, Eduardo López Albizu, a prominent Spanish left-wing anti-Francoist activist. He joined the Young Basque Socialist movement in 1975, and was its Secretary-General from 1985 to 1988. He joined PSE in 1977, and was elected to the Spanish Congress of Deputies at the 1986 General Election representing Vizcaya Province. In the PSE he rose steadily to prominence before being elected Secretary-General in 1997, having become a Member of the Basque Parliament in 1991.

He is known for his opposition to Basque independence. In 2005, he was the PSE-EE's candidate for the presidency of the Basque Country, but lost out to Juan José Ibarretxe of the Basque Nationalist Party (PNV). In the 2009 election, the Nationalist Party was the party with the most votes with 30 seats, followed by the Socialist Party, with 25 seats. The illegalisation of a party representing a sizeable voting segment, the Left Basque Nationalist Party Batasuna, enabled the socialists to reach an agreement with the People's Party for López to be elected as Lehendakari (Basque president). He was elected to the position on 5 May 2009 in the Basque Parliament, effectively ending thirty years of Basque nationalist rule in the Basque Country, in what was perceived as a controversial election due to the absence of any party representing the secessionist Left Basque Nationalist spectrum.

On 13 January 2016, he was elected President of the Congress of Deputies for the short eleventh legislature, with 130 votes (the deputies of PSOE and Citizens) out of 350.

References

External links
 Patxi López Blog

|-

|-

1959 births
Living people
Members of the 4th Basque Parliament
Members of the 5th Basque Parliament
Members of the 6th Basque Parliament
Members of the 7th Basque Parliament
Members of the 8th Basque Parliament
Members of the 9th Basque Parliament
Members of the 10th Basque Parliament
Members of the 3rd Congress of Deputies (Spain)
Members of the 12th Congress of Deputies (Spain)
Members of the 11th Congress of Deputies (Spain)
Members of the 13th Congress of Deputies (Spain)
People from Portugalete
Presidents of the Basque Government
Presidents of the Congress of Deputies (Spain)
Spanish Socialist Workers' Party politicians
Members of the 14th Congress of Deputies (Spain)